Metachanda coetivyella is a moth species in the oecophorine tribe Metachandini. It was described by Henry Legrand in 1965. Its type locality is Coëtivy Island, a small coral island of Seychelles.

References

Oecophorinae
Moths described in 1965
Moths of Seychelles